KTLH may refer to:

 Tallahassee International Airport (ICAO code KTLH)
 KTLH (FM), a radio station (107.9 FM) licensed to serve Hallsville, Texas, United States
 KSSZ, a radio station (93.9 FM) licensed to serve Fayette, Missouri, United States, which held the call sign KTLH from June 1994 to September 1996